AGL Energy Ltd is an Australian listed public company involved in both the generation and retailing of electricity and gas for residential and commercial use. AGL is Australia's largest electricity generator, and the nation's largest carbon emitter. In 2014, the company had an operated generation capacity of 10,984 MW. The company emitted 42,227,180 Total Scope 1 Emissions (t -e) in 2019-20 and 40,209,034 t -e in 2020–21. AGL is also a significant investor, owner, and operator, of renewable energy assets.

AGL Energy generates energy from power stations that use thermal power, natural gas, wind power, hydroelectricity, solar energy, gas storage and coal seam gas sources.

AGL claimed in August 2021 that it had more than 4.5 million residential and business customer accounts across New South Wales, Victoria, South Australia and Queensland, making it the largest fully integrated energy company, telecommunications company, and utility in Australia. AGL entered the residential and commercial gas market in Western Australia in July 2017.

History

The Australian Gas Light Company was formed in Sydney in 1837, and supplied town gas for the first public lighting of a street lamp in Sydney in 1841. AGL was the second company to list on the Sydney Stock Exchange. The company gradually diversified into electricity and into a number of different locations.

ActewAGL, a joint venture between the Australian Gas Light Company and Icon Water, a government-owned enterprise of the ACT Government, was formed in October 2000 as Australia's first utility joint venture. Twenty-five per cent owned by AGL Energy, ActewAGL provides electricity, natural gas, and telecommunication services to business and residential customers in the Australian Capital Territory and south-east New South Wales.

In 2000, AGL purchased emerging telecommunications provider Dingo Blue from C&W Optus for $22m. AGL closed Dingo Blue down in 2003 

AGL had New Zealand assets including a gas distribution system in the Hutt Valley and Porirua area, owned through its 71% owned subsidiary Natural Gas Corporation. This network was sold to Vector in 2004 for NZ$814 million. The company bought Transalta NZ's electricity retail business for NZ$824 million in 2001. Subsequently, selling the electricity retail asset for a loss.

On 6 October 2006, the Australian Gas Light Company and Alinta merged and restructured to create two new listed companies, a restructured Alinta Ltd and AGL Energy Ltd.

In Victoria, in June 2012, AGL Energy acquired Loy Yang A Power Station and the Loy Yang coal mine.

In New South Wales, in September 2014 AGL Energy acquired Macquarie Generation from the New South Wales Government for $1.5 billion. Macquarie Generation's assets included the 2,640 MW Bayswater Power Station, the 2,000 MW Liddell Power Station, the 50 MW Hunter Valley Gas Turbines and the Liddell Solar Thermal Project. From the two thermal coal power stations and two oil-fired gas turbines, Macquarie Generation supplies approximately 12% of the National Electricity Market and 30% of the New South Wales electricity market. In early stages, Macquarie has commenced development of solar thermal power as a renewable source of energy.

AGL announced in April 2015 and reaffirmed in September 2017 that it intends to close the Liddell Power Station in 2022. The closure of this and other coal-burning power stations in Australia led to Prime Minister Malcolm Turnbull, to seek advice from the Australian Energy Market Operator on extending the life of a number of them, to head off future power shortages. Turnbull said the government had been advised that if the Liddell plant were to close in 2022, there would be a 1,000 MW gap in base load, dispatchable power generation.

In 2018, AGL was among 17 energy businesses that supported the launch of the Energy Charter, a global initiative aimed at bringing together all parts of the power supply chain to give customers more affordable and reliable energy.

In 2019, AGL entered the telecommunications industry with the purchase of Southern Phone, a regional telecommunications company.

In June 2021, AGL announced its intention to split into a bulk power generator and a carbon-neutral energy retailer. AGL Energy was to be rebranded as Accel Energy and hold the company's coal-fired power plants and wind farm contracts, while the electricity and gas retail assets were to be spun off into a separately listed company, AGL Australia. In May 2022, the proposed split was abandoned with the chairman, two board members and CEO resigning, the company citing the proposal was unlikely to gain the required 75% shareholder approval.

Carbon emissions output
AGL currently owns three coal-burning power stations which produce a majority of its power generation.
 
The Australian Government Clean Energy Regulator publishes an annual list of the ten largest emitters of greenhouse gases. In the 2019-20 financial year, AGL came first place on the list, with reported emissions of 42.4 million tonnes, which is equivalent to nine million cars on the road.

AGL is responsible for more than double the carbon emissions of Australia's second-biggest electricity generator, and more than BHP, Rio Tinto, Glencore, and Qantas combined. AGL's coal-burning power stations are responsible for eight per cent of Australia's total national emissions.

Mergers and acquisitions
This is a listing of AGL's corporate acquisitions and disposals.

Operations and significant assets
AGL has a diverse power generation portfolio—including base, peaking and intermediate generation plants—spread across traditional thermal generation as well as renewable sources including hydro and wind. The following tables listing significant assets are based on AGL's 2016 Annual Report.

Coal and gas fired power stations

Renewable energy

AGL holds 20% of the Powering Australian Renewables Fund, which is Australia's largest privately owned renewable energy company.

Gas

Upstream gas projects
In 2015 the New South Wales Environment Protection Authority ordered the suspension of AGL's Gloucester operations after finding toxic chemicals had been introduced into Hunter Water's systems. The EPA subsequently found no "evidence of harm to the environment or pollution of waters" and AGL was allowed to continue its Gloucester operations.

In February 2016, AGL announced that exploration and production of natural gas assets would no longer be a core business for the company. This announcement included clarification that AGL would not proceed with the Gloucester gas project and that it would cease production at the Camden Gas Project in South West Sydney in 2023, twelve years earlier than previously proposed.

AGL has implemented a decommissioning and rehabilitation program for its well sites and other infrastructure in the Gloucester region. In November 2016, AGL commenced the progressive decommissioning and rehabilitation of wells at the Camden site.

Power generation projects in development

Coopers Gap Wind Farm
In August 2017, it was announced that the Coopers Gap Wind Farm would proceed to construction, with AGL securing funding from the Powering Australian Renewables Fund. When completed the 453 MW Coopers Gap Wind Farm will be the largest in Australia. The final wind turbine at the Coopers Gap Wind Farm was completed in April 2020.

Silverton Wind Farm
In May 2017, it was announced that construction had commenced on the 200 MW Silverton Wind Farm in north western New South Wales.

Barker Inlet Power Station
In June 2017, AGL announced the development of a new $295 million gas-fired generator in South Australia. The Barker Inlet Power Station, will replace two of the four Torrens Island A turbines which are expected to be decommissioned in late 2020. The island's B turbines will continue to operate as usual. The Barker Inlet Power Station was officially completed and handed over to AGL in early 2020.

Crib Point Gas Import Jetty
In August 2017, Crib Point Import Jetty was announced as the preferred location for a new terminal importing gas from other markets. The project is expected to cost $250 million, with construction expected to commence in 2021.

In 2021, the Andrews State Government halted the project, despite gas shortages being forecasted, forcing AGL to announce that it would no longer proceed with the project.

Kanmantoo pumped hydro
In April 2019, AGL announced that it had acquired the right to develop a pumped hydroelectric energy storage project in the mined-out main pit of the Kanmantoo mine on the eastern side of the Adelaide Hills in South Australia. The project is expected to be capable of storing and generating 250MW of electricity from 2024. In early 2020, AGL announced that it would not be proceeding with the Kanmantoo Pumped Hydro project.

Powering Australian Renewables
In February 2016, AGL announced the creation of the Powering Australian Renewables Fund. The Powering Australian Renewables Fund or PARF (now PowAR), owns and develops more than 1,000MW of large-scale renewable energy projects to support Australia's renewable energy capacity and transition to a low-carbon economy. Once fully invested, PARF expects to own approximately 10% of Australia's renewable energy capacity.

In June 2016, Queensland Investment Corporation and the Future Fund joined AGL as investors in Powering Australian Renewables.

See also

 Better Place
 Renewable energy in Australia

References

External links
Company website

Companies based in Sydney
Companies listed on the Australian Securities Exchange
Electric power companies of Australia
Energy companies established in 2006
Australian companies established in 2006